Nickelsville (formerly Nicholsville) is an unincorporated community in Gordon County, in the U.S. state of Georgia.

History
The community was named in honor of Lawrence Nichols. An early variant name was "Little Five Points".

References

Unincorporated communities in Gordon County, Georgia
Unincorporated communities in Georgia (U.S. state)